Tsvetomir Tsonkov (born 25 June 1981) is a Bulgarian footballer who plays as a midfielder for Neftochimic Burgas.

Career
He started his career in Shumen before moving for PFC Svetkavitsa.

His contract with Chernomorets Burgas was mutually terminated in June 2013.

On 25 November 2013, Tsonkov opened the scoring for Neftochimic Burgas in an A PFG match against CSKA Sofia with a long distance effort; his goal was eventually recognized as the goal of the year.

In June 2017, Tsonkov signed with Oborishte.

References

External links
 

1981 births
Living people
Bulgarian footballers
First Professional Football League (Bulgaria) players
Second Professional Football League (Bulgaria) players
PFC Svetkavitsa players
PFC Chernomorets Burgas players
Neftochimic Burgas players
PFC Nesebar players
FC Oborishte players
Association football midfielders
People from Shumen